In the Australian Football League, many teams contest trophies or individual awards on an annual or regular basis in individual premiership matches during the home-and-away season. Many of these awards honour a legend or legends of the competing clubs, or are used as part of events to support a charitable cause.

This list covers recurring trophies or awards in home-and-away matches of the AFL season. Not included are once-off awards, or awards presented in representative or finals matches.

Australian Football League

AFL Women's

See also
 Rivalries in the Australian Football League

References

Australian Football League awards
Australian rules football-related lists
individual match awards in the Australian Football League